ICAM was an Australian television program focusing on Indigenous affairs that aired on SBS from 1995 until 2002. ICAM was the first Indigenous affairs program on SBS, and during its run was the only prime time Indigenous affairs program broadcast on national television in Australia. ICAM aired weekly and was hosted by Karla Grant. Production wound back in 2001, and Grant went on to develop ICAM's successor, Living Black. In its final year of production, the program won a Walkley Award for Coverage of Indigenous Affairs, for journalist Julie Nimmo's story "No Fixed Address".

References

External links
 

Special Broadcasting Service original programming
Australian non-fiction television series
1995 Australian television series debuts
1990s Australian television series
2000s Australian television series
English-language television shows